Stony Point was a village community in the central part of the Riverina which now locates only the local class 4 public school about.  It is situated by road, about 9 kilometres north from Leeton and 10 kilometres south from Murrami.

Notes and references

Towns in the Riverina
Towns in New South Wales
Leeton Shire